The state of West Virginia has a wide variety of freshwater fish species in its rivers, lakes, and streams.  20% of these species are sportfish, and the remaining 80% are nongame species.

The taxa
The following letters indicate the river systems that contain each species:

In addition, the IUCN classifies one of these species as critically endangered , one as endangered , five as vulnerable , and three as near-threatened .

Order Petromyzontiformes (lampreys)
Family Petromyzontidae (northern lampreys)
 Ohio lamprey (Ichthyomyzon bdellium) O, rare
 Northern brook lamprey (Ichthyomyzon fossor) O, rare
 Mountain brook lamprey (Ichthyomyzon greeleyi) O, rare
 Silver lamprey (Ichthyomyzon unicuspis) O, rare
 Least brook lamprey (Lampetra aepyptera) O,N
 American brook lamprey (Lethenteron appendix) O, rare

Order Acipenseriformes (sturgeons and paddlefish)
Family Acipenseridae (sturgeons)
 Lake sturgeon (Acipenser fulvescens) O, extinct in West Virginia
 Shovelnose sturgeon (Scaphirhynchus platorynchus) O, 

Family Polyodontidae (paddlefishes)
 American paddlefish (Polyodon spathula) O, rare,

Order Lepisosteiformes (gars)
Family Lepisosteidae (gars)
 Longnose gar (Lepisosteus osseus) O

Order Amiiformes (bowfin)
Family Amiidae (bowfin)
 Bowfin (Amia calva) O, rare

Order Hiodontiformes (mooneyes)
Family Hiodontidae (mooneyes)
 Goldeye (Hiodon alosoides) O, rare
 Mooneye (Hiodon tergisus) O

Order Anguilliformes (eels)
Family Anguillidae (freshwater eels)
 American eel (Anguilla rostrata) O,N,P,

Order Clupeiformes (herrings and relatives)
Family Clupeidae (herrings, shads, and relatives)
 Skipjack shad (Alosa chrysochloris) O
 Alewife (Alosa pseudoharengus) O,N,P
 American gizzard shad (Dorosoma cepedianum) O
 Threadfin shad (Dorosoma petenense) O

Order Cypriniformes (carps, minnows, and relatives)
Family Cyprinidae (carps, true minnows, and relatives)
 Central stoneroller (Campostoma anomalum) O,N,P,J
 Goldfish (Carassius auratus) O,N,P, introduced
 Redside dace (Clinostomus elongatus) O, rare
 Rosyside dace (Clinostomus funduloides) O,N,P,J
 Satinfin shiner (Cyprinella analostana) P, rare
 Whitetail shiner (Cyprinella galactura) O,N
 Spotfin shiner (Cyprinella spiloptera) O,N,P
 Steelcolor shiner (Cyprinella whipplei) O
 Common carp (Cyprinus carpio) O,N,P, introduced,  
 Grass carp (Ctenopharyngodon idella) O,N,P
 Bighead carp (Hypopthalmichthys nobilis) O
 Streamline chub (Erimystax dissimilis) O,N
 Tonguetied minnow (Exoglossum laurae) O,N, rare
 Cutlips minnow (Exoglossum maxillingua) N,P,J
 Eastern silvery minnow (Hybognathus regius) P, rare
 Mississippi silvery minnow (Hybognathus nuchalis) O, extinct in West Virginia
 Bigeye chub (Hybopsis amblops) O
 White shiner (Luxilus albeolus) O,N
 Striped shiner (Luxilus chrysocephalus) O,N,P
 Common shiner (Luxilus cornutus) O,P,J
 Rosefin shiner (Lythrurus ardens) J, rare
 Scarlet shiner (Lythrurus fasciolaris) O, rare
 Redfin shiner (Lythrurus umbratilis) O
 Shoal chub (Macrhybopsis hyostoma) O
 Silver chub (Macrhybopsis storeriana) O
 Allegheny pearl dace (Margariscus margarita) O,P, rare
 Hornyhead chub (Nocomis biguttatus) O, extinct in West Virginia
 Bluehead chub (Nocomis leptocephalus) N,P,J
 River chub (Nocomis micropogon) O,P,J
 Bigmouth chub (Nocomis platyrhynchus) N
 Golden shiner (Notemigonus crysoleucas) O,N,P,J
 Comely shiner (Notropis amoenus) P
 Popeye shiner (Notropis ariommus) O, rare
 Emerald shiner (Notropis atherinoides) O,N,P
 River shiner (Notropis blennius) O
 Bigeye shiner (Notropis boops) O, rare
 Ghost shiner (Notropis buchanani) O
 Bigmouth shiner (Notropis dorsalis) O, extinct in West Virginia
 Spottail shiner (Notropis hudsonius) O,N,P
 Sand shiner (Notropis stramineus) O,N
 Silver shiner (Notropis photogenis) O,N
 Swallowtail shiner (Notropis procne) P
 Rosyface shiner (Notropis rubellus) O,N,P,J
 New River shiner (Notropis scabriceps) N, rare
 Telescope shiner (Notropis telescopus) O,N,J
 Mimic shiner (Notropis volucellus) O,N,P
 Channel shiner (Notropis wickliffi) O
 Silverjaw minnow (Ericymba buccata) O,N,P
 Pugnose minnow (Opsopoeodus emiliae) O, extinct in West Virginia
 Suckermouth minnow (Phenacobius mirabilis) O
 Kanawha minnow (Phenacobius teretulus) N, rare
 Southern redbelly dace (Chrosomus erythrogaster) O
 Mountain redbelly dace (Chrosomus oreas) O,N,J
 Bluntnose minnow (Pimephales notatus) O,N,P
 Fathead minnow (Pimephales promelas) O,N,P
 Bullhead minnow (Pimephales vigilax) O, rare
 Eastern blacknose dace (Rhinichthys atratulus) O,P,J
 Western blacknose dace (Rhinichthys obtusus) O,N
 Cheat minnow (Pararhinichthys bowersi) O, rare
 Longnose dace (Rhinichthys cataractae) O,N,P,J
 Common rudd (Scardinius erythrophthalmus) N
 Creek chub (Semotilus atromaculatus) O,N,P,J
 Fallfish (Semotilus corporalis) P

Family Catostomidae (suckers)
 River carpsucker (Carpiodes carpio) O
 Quillback (Carpiodes cyprinus) O
 Highfin carpsucker (Carpiodes velifer) O, rare
 Longnose sucker (Catostomus catostomus) O, extinct in West Virginia
 White sucker (Catostomus commersonii) O,N,P,J
 Blue sucker (Cycleptus elongatus) O, rare
 Creek chubsucker (Erimyzon oblongus) P
 Northern hogsucker (Hypentelium nigricans) O,N,P,J
 Smallmouth buffalo (Ictiobus bubalus) O
 Bigmouth buffalo (Ictiobus cyprinellus) O, rare
 Black buffalo (Ictiobus niger) O, rare
 Spotted sucker (Minytrema melanops) O
 Silver redhorse (Moxostoma anisurum) O
 River redhorse (Moxostoma carinatum) O
 Black redhorse (Moxostoma duquesnei) O
 Golden redhorse (Moxostoma erythrurum) O,N,P
 Smallmouth redhorse (Moxostoma breviceps) O
 Shorthead redhorse (Moxostoma macrolepidotum) P, rare
 Torrent sucker (Thoburnia rhothoeca) N,P

Order Siluriformes (catfishes)
Family Ictaluridae (ictalurid catfishes)
 White bullhead (Ameiurus catus) O
 Black bullhead (Ameiurus melas) O,N
 Yellow bullhead (Ameiurus natalis) O,N,P
 Brown bullhead (Ameiurus nebulosus) O,N,P
 Blue catfish (Ictalurus furcatus) O
 Channel catfish (Ictalurus punctatus) O,N,P
 Mountain madtom (Noturus eleutherus) O, rare
 Stonecat (Noturus flavus) O,N
 Margined madtom (Noturus insignis) O,N,P,J
 Brindled madtom (Noturus miurus) O
 Northern madtom (Noturus stigmosus) O, rare, 
 Flathead catfish (Pylodictis olivaris) O,N

Order Esociformes (pikes and mudminnows)
Family Esocidae (pikes)
 Redfin pickerel (Esox a. americanus) O,P, rare
 Grass pickerel (Esox americanus vermiculatus) O, rare
 Northern pike (Esox lucius) O,P
 Muskellunge (Esox masquinongy) O,N,P
 Tiger muskellunge (Esox masquinongy x lucius) O,N,P
 Chain pickerel (Esox niger) O,N,P

Family Umbridae (mudminnows)
 Central mudminnow (Umbra limi) O

Order Salmoniformes (trout)
Family Salmonidae (trout)
 Cutthroat trout (Oncorhynchus clarkii) P, introduced
 Rainbow trout (Oncorhynchus mykiss) O,N,P,J, introduced
 Brown trout (Salmo trutta) O,N,J,P, introduced
 Brook trout (Salvelinus fontinalis) O,N,J,P

Order Percopsiformes (trout-perch)
Family Percopsidae (trout-perch)
 Trout-perch (Percopsis omiscomaycus) O

Order Cyprinodontiformes (toothcarps)
Family Fundulidae (topminnows)
 Northern studfish (Fundulus catenatus) O
 Banded killifish (Fundulus diaphanus) O,P, rare
 Mummichog (Fundulus heteroclitus) P

Family Poeciliidae (livebearers)
 Mosquitofish (Gambusia affinis) O,N,P

Order Atheriniformes (silversides)
Family Atherinopsidae (neotropical silversides)
 Brook silverside (Labidesthes sicculus) O,N,P

Order Gasterosteiformes (sticklebacks)
Family Gasterosteidae (sticklebacks)
 Brook stickleback (Culaea inconstans) O

Order Scorpaeniformes (mail-cheeked fishes)
Family Cottidae (sculpins)
 Mottled sculpin (Cottus bairdii) O,N,J
 Blue Ridge sculpin (Cottus caeruleomentum) P,J
 Slimy sculpin (Cottus cognatus) P, rare
 Potomac sculpin (Cottus girardi) P
 Kanawha sculpin (Cottus kanawhae) N, rare
 Bluestone sculpin (Cottus sp.) N

Order Perciformes (sunfishes and perches)
Family Moronidae (temperate basses)
 White perch (Morone americana) O
 White bass (Morone chrysops) O,N
 Striped bass (Morone saxatilis) O,N
 Hybrid striped bass (Morone chrysops x saxatilis) O

Family Centrarchidae (sunfishes)
 Rock bass (Ambloplites rupestris) O,N,J,P
 Redbreast sunfish (Lepomis auritus) O,N,J,P
 Green sunfish (Lepomis cyanellus) O,N,J,P
 Pumpkinseed (Lepomis gibbosus) O,N,J,P
 Warmouth (Lepomis gulosus) O,P
 Orangespotted sunfish (Lepomis humilis) O
 Bluegill (Lepomis macrochirus) O,N,J,P
 Longear sunfish (Lepomis megalotis) O,N,P
 Redear sunfish (Lepomis microlophus) O
 Smallmouth bass (Micropterus dolomieu) O,N,J,P
 Spotted bass (Micropterus punctulatus) O,N
 Largemouth bass (Micropterus salmoides) O,N,J,P
 White crappie (Pomoxis annularis) O,N,P
 Black crappie (Pomoxis nigromaculatus) O,N,P

Family Percidae (perches, darters, and relatives)
 Eastern sand darter (Ammocrypta pellucida) O
 Western sand darter (Ammocrypta clara) O, rare, 
 Diamond darter (Crystallaria cincotta) O, rare, 
 Greenside darter (Etheostoma blennioides) O,N,P
 Rainbow darter (Etheostoma caeruleum) O,N,P
 Bluebreast darter (Etheostoma camurum) O
 Fantail darter (Etheostoma flabellare) O,N,P,J
 Longfin darter (Etheostoma longimanum) J, rare
 Spotted darter (Etheostoma maculatum) O, rare, 
 Johnny darter (Etheostoma nigrum) O,N,J
 Tessellated darter (Etheostoma olmstedi) P
 Candy darter (Etheostoma osburni) N, rare, 
 Snubnose darter (Etheostoma simoterum) N
 Tippecanoe darter (Etheostoma tippecanoe) O, 
 Variegate darter (Etheostoma variatum) O,N
 Banded darter (Etheostoma zonale) O
 Yellow perch (Perca flavescens) O,N,P
 Common logperch (Percina caprodes) O,N
 Channel darter (Percina copelandi) O
 Gilt darter (Percina evides) O, rare
 Appalachia darter (Percina gymnocephala) N, rare
 Longhead darter (Percina macrocephala) O, rare
 Blackside darter (Percina maculata) O,N
 Stripeback darter (Percina notogramma) J, rare
 Sharpnose darter (Percina oxyrhynchus) O,N
 Shield darter (Percina peltata) P
 Slenderhead darter (Percina phoxocephala) O
 Roanoke darter (Percina roanoka) N
 Dusky darter (Percina sciera) O
 River darter (Percina shumardi) O, rare
 Sauger (Sander canadensis) O
 Walleye (Sander vitreus) O,N,P
 Saugeye (Sander canadensis x vitreus) O

Family Sciaenidae (drums)
 Freshwater drum (Aplodinotus grunniens) O

List of West Virginia fishes by spawning temperature

Graphical thermometer

Data table

See also

West Virginia State Wildlife Center, a small zoo featuring native West Virginia animals
Fauna of West Virginia
List of West Virginia wildlife management areas

References

Fishes
West Virginia
West Virginia
West Virginia
Natural history of West Virginia